Heritage Plaza is a postmodern skyscraper located in the Skyline District of downtown Houston, Texas. The building, designed by Houston-based M. Nasr & Partners P.C., was completed in 1987, and has 53 floors.

History
Heritage Plaza completed construction in early 1987. It was the last major office building completed in downtown Houston in the midst of the collapse of the Texas real estate, banking, and oil industries in the 1980s. The building stood as the most recently completed major skyscraper in Houston for nearly 15 years, until the completion of 1500 Louisiana Street in 2002.

The building has  of leaseable space, of which a vast majority sat vacant until Texaco leased  in 1989. The building went on to serve as the US  headquarters of Texaco for 12 years. In 2001, Heritage Plaza became the US headquarters of the ChevronTexaco corporation.

In 2005, Goddard Investment Group acquired the building. In 2006, EOG Resources announced that it will move from 3 Allen Center to Heritage Plaza. The firm, scheduled to move in early 2007, became the largest tenant in the building at the time.

In early 2007, Deloitte & Touche USA L.L.P. executed a lease to occupy  as part of a 12-year, 10-floor lease with options to increase that space, if needed. The new lease consolidated staff from three Houston sites to one downtown location, making Deloitte the largest tenant in Heritage Plaza.

Design

Heritage Plaza is well known because of its central location in the central business district skyline, and for the stepped granite feature located on the top of the building that resembles a Mayan pyramid. This feature was inspired by the architect's visit to the Mexican Yucatán Peninsula. The crown of the building is also said to resemble an image of a bald eagle spreading its wings.

The interior lobby of Heritage Plaza was also designed with Mexican influences. The lower levels of the building, which contain a large food court, contain a distinctive multi-level marble waterfall that falls from the lobby.

Heritage Plaza is one of the few skyscrapers in downtown Houston that is not directly connected to the extensive Houston tunnel network. It is, however, connected to the DoubleTree Hotel Houston-Allen Center through a skyway.

See also

List of tallest buildings in Houston
List of tallest buildings in Texas
List of tallest buildings in the United States

References

External links

Official site

Skyscraper office buildings in Houston
Office buildings completed in 1987
Oil company headquarters in the United States
Chevron Corporation
Buildings and structures in Houston
Postmodern architecture in Texas